Serang Regency is a regency of Banten province, Indonesia. It is located in the northwest corner of the island of Java. The administrative center of the regency is at Ciruas, while the capital of the province is the independent municipality of Serang (Kota Serang) which was split off the regency on 17 July 2007.

Serang municipality is about 10 km from Old Banten, the eponymous former sultanate's capital.  Merak, a major port and ferry terminal, is located at the northwest tip of Java, within the independent municipality of Cilegon, which was split off from the regency on 20 April 1999.  Serang Regency and its semi-enclaved cities have experienced a heavy influx of residents as Jakarta continues its outward growth; some planning agencies consider it to be part of the metropolitan area. It shares its eastern border with Tangerang Regency of Jabodetabek.

Serang Regency covers an area of 1,467.35 km2, and had a population of 1,402,818 at the 2010 Census and 1,622,630 at the 2020 Census; the official estimate as at mid 2022 was 1,678,914. Including Cilegon and Serang cities which the regency surrounds on their landward sides, the 2022 population amounted to 2,849,548 inhabiting 1,909.56 km2, for an overall density of 1,492 per km2. Cilegon and Serang cities are semi-enclaves within Serang Regency.

Serang Regency is bounded by Java Sea to the north, Sunda Strait to the west, Tangerang Regency of Greater Jakarta to the east, Lebak Regency and Pandeglang Regency to the south.

Administrative districts 
As at time of the 2010 Census, the Regency was divided into twenty-eight districts (kecamatan). However, an additional district - Lebak Wangi - has been created since 2010 from the southeastern part of Pontang District and other neighbouring districts. The districts are tabulated below with their current areas and their populations at the 2010 Census and the 2020 Census, together with the official estimates as at mid 2022. The districts are subdivided into 326 'villages' (desa and kelurahan). The table also includes the number of administrative villages (desa) within each district, and its postal code.

Note: (a) the 2010 population on the new Lebak Wangi District is included in the figures for the districts from which it was cut out.

References